Lois Green Carr (1922–2015) was a historian of Colonial Maryland and the European settlement of the Chesapeake Bay, serving as the principal historian of St. Mary's City, Maryland for over four decades.

Biography 
Carr was born in Holyoke, Massachusetts on March 7, 1922, the daughter of Pulitzer Prize-winning historian Constance McLaughlin Green. She attended The Putney School in Putney, Vermont and earned a bachelor's degree from Swarthmore College. She earned a master's degree from Radcliffe College and a Ph.D. in history from Harvard University.

Twenty-four years elapsed between Carr's master's degree and her Ph.D., because she left Harvard in 1947 after getting married and moving to New York. She later moved to Maryland, divorced and remarried, and started a new thesis on Maryland history, finishing her doctorate in 1968. She had one son from her first marriage, Andrew R. Clark.

Carr started as a junior archivist in 1956 at the Maryland State Archives in Annapolis, becoming a senior adjunct scholar in 1988. She became the historian for Historic St. Mary's City in 1967, founding a research program seeking to document the lives of every known 17th-century St. Mary's resident. She was president of the Economic History Association in 1990–91.

Carr was an Adjunct Professor of History at the University of Maryland, College Park from 1982 to 2005. She was a pioneer in the field of colonial history, designing and directing several long-term team history research projects that won support from the National Science Foundation and the National Endowment for the Humanities. In 1992, the a conference was organized at the University of Maryland in her honor, Lois Green Carr: The Chesapeake and Beyond - A Celebration.

Carr was a co-author of Robert Cole's World: Agriculture and Society in Early Maryland, which won the Alice Hanson Jones Prize from the Economic History Association in 1992 and the Maryland Historical Society Book prize in 1993. She was one of the 1996 recipients of the Eisenberg Prize for Excellence in the Humanities. In 2000 she was named to the Maryland Women's Hall of Fame.

Carr died of dementia complications in Annapolis, Maryland on June 28, 2015.

Publications

References

1922 births
2015 deaths
The Putney School alumni
Swarthmore College alumni
Radcliffe College alumni
University of Maryland, College Park faculty
People from Holyoke, Massachusetts
People from Annapolis, Maryland
Historians of Colonial North America